This is the filmography of American actor Jack Elam (November 13, 1920 – October 20, 2003), including his film and television appearances, between 1949 and 1995.

Selected filmography

Television

See also

Notes

References
 Fagen, Herb (2003). The Encyclopedia of Westerns. New York: Facts On File. .

External links

Male actor filmographies
American filmographies